Amidu is a Ghanaian given name and surname. Notable people with the surname include:

Amidu Salifu (born 1992), Ghanaian football midfielder 
Amin Amidu Sulemana (born 1955), Ghanaian diplomat and politician
Martin Amidu, Ghanaian politician and lawyer

Ghanaian surnames